Robert E. Belfanti Jr. (October 15, 1948 – October 29, 2016) was a Democratic member of the Pennsylvania House of Representatives.

Background
Born in Danville, Pennsylvania, Belfanti graduated from Mount Carmel High School. From 1967 to 1971, Belfanti served in the United States Marine Corps. In 1970 and 1971, Belfanti went to University of North Carolina. He was a residential contractor. He died on October 29, 2016, at the age of 68.

Arson of district office
On March 23, 2008, Belfanti's district office was damaged by fire in an arson set by a man who had been upset about the results of a child custody case in Huntingdon County, Pennsylvania.

References

1948 births
2016 deaths
People from Danville, Pennsylvania
University of North Carolina alumni
Businesspeople from Pennsylvania
Democratic Party members of the Pennsylvania House of Representatives
20th-century American businesspeople